The 1932 Tulsa Golden Hurricane football team represented the University of Tulsa during the 1932 college football season. In their eighth year under head coach Gus Henderson, the Golden Hurricane compiled a 7–1–1 record, won the Big Four Conference championship, and outscored 175 to 36.  The team began the season with a loss to Oklahoma (0-7) and ended it with a win over Ole Miss (26-0).

Schedule

References

Tulsa
Tulsa Golden Hurricane football seasons
Tulsa Golden Hurricane football